Laketon is an unincorporated census-designated place in Pleasant Township, Wabash County, in the U.S. state of Indiana.

History
Laketon was laid out in 1836. A post office was established at Laketon in 1838, and remained in operation until it was discontinued in 2010.

Geography

Demographics

References

Census-designated places in Wabash County, Indiana
Census-designated places in Indiana